The South Shetland Trough is an undersea trough located north of the South Shetland Islands. It is the remnant of a subduction zone where the defunct Phoenix Plate, now part of the Antarctic Plate, subducted under the Antarctic Peninsula and the South Shetland Islands.

References

Oceanic basins of the Southern Ocean
Subduction zones